Paulo Victor Dias de Andrade (born 13 October 1998), commonly known as Paulo Victor, is a Brazilian footballer who currently plays as a midfielder for Resende.

Career statistics

Club

Notes

References

1998 births
Living people
Brazilian footballers
Association football midfielders
Volta Redonda FC players
Resende Futebol Clube players
Grêmio Foot-Ball Porto Alegrense players
People from Barra do Piraí